Adam Enright (born November 16, 1983, in Rosalind, Alberta) is a Canadian curler from Edmonton, Alberta. He is a former alternate for Kevin Martin's rink with whom he won a gold medal at the 2010 Winter Olympics as well as wins at the 2008 Tim Hortons Brier and the 2008 World Men's Curling Championship. Currently, Enright plays third for Kurt Balderston's rink.

Career
In 2002, Enright won the Alberta Junior Championship as the third for Justin Jacobsen.  The team finished with a 6–6 record at the 2002 Canadian Junior Curling Championships. Since juniors, Enright has played for such skips as Chris Schille, Charley Thomas and Mark Johnson. In 2006, he played at the Players' Championships as the lead for the Kevin Martin team. They brought him back in 2008 to be their alternate for the Brier and World Championships. They brought him back once again for the 2009 Canadian Olympic Curling Trials. The Martin team won that, giving them (and Enright) the opportunity to play at the 2010 Winter Olympics, where they won the gold medal after defeating Norway in the final. Enright played third for Tom Appelman before playing for Balderston, with whom he qualified for the Alberta provincials.

Personal life
Enright is married to fellow curler Stephanie Enright.

References

Sources
 

1983 births
Living people
Brier champions
Curlers at the 2010 Winter Olympics
Medalists at the 2010 Winter Olympics
Olympic curlers of Canada
Olympic gold medalists for Canada
Olympic medalists in curling
People from Camrose County
Curlers from Edmonton
World curling champions
Canadian male curlers
Canada Cup (curling) participants